Pirenella cingulata is a species of medium-sized sea snails or mud snails, marine gastropod mollusks in the family Potamididae, the horn snails.

Distribution
 Indo-Pacific coast.
 Hormozgan Province in Iran.

Description

Ecology
Parasites of Cerithideopsilla cingulata include:
 Heterophyidae: Cerithideopsilla cingulata serves as the first intermediate host of Heterophyes nocens.
 Echinostomatidae: Cerithideopsilla cingulata serves as the first intermediate host of Acanthoparyphium tyosenense.

References

External links
 SeaLifeBase: Pirenella cingulata info

Potamididae
Marine molluscs of Asia
Mangrove fauna
Fauna of Southeast Asia
Fauna of Indonesia
Invertebrates of Malaysia
Gastropods described in 1791
Taxa named by Johann Friedrich Gmelin